Motorhellington is the third album by the Italian band Zu, which appear in Roy Paci on trumpet and backing vocals and Eugene Chadbourne on guitar and vocals.

Track list
 Iron Man – 8:45
 The Robots – 5:29
 Chain of Fools – 7:07
 Boogie Stop Shuffle – 8:18
 Corcovado – 7:16
 Pushin' Too Hard – 5:22
 Sex Machine – 6:37
 Sacrifice – 3:06

References

Zu (band) albums
2000 albums